Arvid Halgeir Nergård (11 April 1923 – 23 November 2006) was a Norwegian bishop in the Church of Norway.

He was born in Lenvik, Norway in 1923.  He received a degree in agronomy in 1943 and the cand.theol. degree in 1952. He served as curate in Sør-Varanger from 1957–1961, vicar in Tana from 1961–1966, vicar in Vadsø from 1966–1969, and vicar in Molde from 1969–1974. From 1974 to 1979 he was dean in Ytre Romsdal, and from 1979-1990 he was the bishop of the Diocese of Nord-Hålogaland.  He died in 2006.

References

1923 births
2006 deaths
People from Lenvik
Bishops of Hålogaland
20th-century Lutheran bishops